Major General Syed Shahid Hamid HJ (17 September 1910 – 12 March 1993) was a two-star general in the Pakistan Army, and a close associate of President Ayub Khan. Hamid was the first Master General of Ordnance (MGO) of the Pakistan Army. He also authored numerous books, most notably Disastrous Twilight - A Personal Record of the Partition of India 1946-1947, an eyewitness account of being on the staff of the last British Commander in Chief of the Indian Army, Field Marshal Sir Claude Auchinleck.

He was the uncle of the Bombay-born British novelist, Salman Rushdie.

He was the grandfather of the British journalist, Mishal Husain.

Early life
Hamid was born in Lucknow, British India, in a Muslim Syed family. He went to school at the Colvin Taluqdar school (Lucknow) in 1923 before going to the Aligarh Muslim University. He was accepted into the Royal Military College Sandhurst in 1932. He received a commission onto the Unattached List, Indian Army on 1 February 1934. He arrived in India on 16 February 1934 and was shortly afterwards attached to the 2nd battalion of the Prince of Wales Volunteers (South Lancashire) regiment at Allahabad. On 12 March 1935, he was admitted into the Indian Army and was posted to the 3rd Cavalry at Meerut. His seniority as a Second Lieutenant was later antedated to on 31 August 1933. He was attached to the Royal Indian Army Service Corps in early 1940 and later permanently transferred. He served in Kohat, Fort Sandeman, and Risalpur. He was promoted to Lieutenant on 30 November 1935 and to Captain on 31 August 1941.

Military career

During the Second World War, he fought on the Burmese front, where his eyes were badly injured. He retreated from Rangoon and was evacuated from Shewbo to Calcutta. In 1943, after being declared fit for duty, he became a Senior Instructor at the Command and Staff College in Quetta. Field Marshal Claude Auchinleck appointed Hamid his Private Secretary on 28 March 1946 and Hamid played an influential role in the decision making by Auchinleck. Shahid Hamid was an inside player in the crucial months leading up to the Partition of India in 1947.

Senior appointments

When Pakistan was created, he opted to join the Pakistan Army. As a Lieutenant-Colonel in 1948, he set up the Inter Services Intelligence from a small office in Karachi.. In 1951, at the age of 41, he became the youngest general in the Pakistan army. He served as both Master General of Ordnance (MGO) Adjutant-General before retiring in July 1959, writing later: 'After the imposition of Martial Law I felt that I had no place in the army and I could not justify to my conscience my existence in these circumstances.' In a meeting with Ayub Khan at the beginning of 1959 he advised him to send the army back to the barracks. Ayub responded that they had a job to do first. Hamid wrote: 'It was obvious that the 'hawks' had his ear and many had been placed in important assignments, where they were enjoying authority and power and wanted the army to stay on.

In 1978, he was summoned back to public life by President Zia ul-Haq, and served as a federal cabinet minister for three years.

Post-retirement

Shahid Hamid was deeply interested in education, and helped found and became a patron of the Aligarh Old Boys Association and established Sir Syed School and Sir Syed Science College for boys and girls at Tipu Road, Rawalpindi. After traveling across Pakistan's mountainous Northern Areas, he helped open up the region for local people and tourists by supporting road projects and writing books and articles in which he described the beauty of the area. For the last 20 years of his life, he wrote and researched books. He wrote one of the early books on Hunza after first visiting in 1954 when the valley was only accessible on horseback or on foot. Other books covered the politics of the Pakistan Movement, and the Pakistani army, as well as an autobiography.

References 

1910 births
1993 deaths
Military personnel from Lucknow
Muhajir people
Pakistani generals
Directors General of Inter-Services Intelligence
British Indian Army officers
Indian Army personnel of World War II
Pakistani military writers
Pakistani travel writers
Graduates of the Royal Military College, Sandhurst
Aligarh Muslim University alumni
Pakistani autobiographers